Thomas Richard Rychlec (born September 11, 1934) is a former professional American football player who played tight end for five seasons for the National Football League's Detroit Lions and the American Football League's Buffalo Bills and Denver Broncos.

External links
American International College Athletics Hall of Fame: Tom Rychlec

1934 births
Living people
People from Meriden, Connecticut
American football tight ends
American International Yellow Jackets football players
Detroit Lions players
Buffalo Bills players
Denver Broncos (AFL) players
American Football League players

(12/12/21) Tom is currently happily living at a retirement community in Waterbury, CT